The thoracodorsal artery is a branch of the subscapular artery.  It travels inferiorly with the thoracodorsal nerve and supplies the latissimus dorsi.

External links
  - "The axillary artery and its major branches shown in relation to major landmarks."
  - "Major Branches of the Axillary Artery"
 

Arteries of the upper limb